The NCAA Men's Gymnastics Championships are a gymnastics competition held each year to determine the best men's college gymnastics team. All schools compete in one National Collegiate division because only 13 schools sponsor NCAA men's gymnastics teams. Three of the 13 teams are not in Division I: Greenville University, Simpson College, Springfield College (Division III).

Schools That Sponsor NCAA Men's Gymnastics
The 15 teams compete in three conferences.

 From the Big Ten: University of Illinois, University of Michigan, University of Nebraska, Ohio State University, Penn State University

 From the ECAC: Greenville University, Simpson College, Springfield College, U.S. Military Academy, U.S. Naval Academy, College of William and Mary

 From the MPSF: University of California - Berkeley, University of Oklahoma, Stanford University, U.S. Air Force Academy

Events

Individual events
All-around
Floor exercise
Pommel horse (side horse)
Rings (still)
Vault 
Parallel bars
Horizontal bar (high bar)

Discontinued events
Trampoline (rebound tumbling)
Tumbling
Rope climb
Flying rings

Champions

Individual champions

Current events 

†

Discontinued events

Team titles

See also

NCAA Division II Men's Gymnastics Championships (1968–82)
NCAA Women's Gymnastics Championships (1982–present)
Pre-NCAA Gymnastics Champions
List of gymnastics terms

Footnotes

References

External links
 NCAA men's gymnastics homepage 
 NCAA Men's Gymnastics Championship Records through 2019
 Division II NCAA Men's Gymnastics Championship Records 1968-84

NCAA Men's Gymnastics championship